Abbas Musliyar was the founder of Al Madeena Islamic complex, Mangalore.  He was also known as Sharaful Ulama Manjanady Abbas Ustad. He was one of the Sunni Muslim leaders of Karnataka and North Kerala.  He was born in Madikeri, India. Musliyar died on 28 July 2019 after a brief illness.

See also
 Al Madeena Islamic complex

References

External links
 Launching website of Al Madeena  
 al madeena

Living people
Indian Islamic religious leaders
1939 births
People from Kodagu district
Leaders of Samastha (AP Faction)